Popular Demand is the second solo album by Black Milk, a rapper and hip hop producer from Detroit, Michigan. It was released on March 13, 2007, which may be a reference to Detroit's area code, 313. The album features guest appearances from numerous Detroit-based artists, including Slum Village's current members T3 and Elzhi and former member Baatin as well as many of Slum Village's close affiliates, most notably Guilty Simpson, Phat Kat, Que D, and One Be Lo (of Binary Star). As of July 3, 2009, Popular Demand has sold  10,679 units according to Soundscan.

Track listing

Bonus CD
Bonus disc containing three tracks from the Broken Wax EP as well as six instrumentals.

Albums produced by Black Milk
2007 albums
Black Milk albums
Fat Beats Records albums